A list of films produced in Italy in 1933 (see 1933 in film):

See also
List of Italian films of 1932
List of Italian films of 1934

References

External links
Italian films of 1933 at the Internet Movie Database

Italian
1933
Films